Mighty Nice is an Irish Sport Horse gelding ridden in the sport of eventing by Phillip Dutton. Dutton and Mighty Nice won a bronze medal in the 2016 Summer Olympics.

Life and career

Mighty Nice is an Irish Sport Horse gelding foaled in 2004. He is owned by HND Group and ridden by Australian-born equestrian Phillip Dutton, who competes for the United States. Dutton and Mighty Nice won a bronze individual medal in eventing during the 2016 Olympic Games in Rio de Janeiro, Brazil.

References

Horses in the Olympics
Eventing horses
Irish Sport Horses